A monastic garden was used by many people and for multiple purposes.  Gardening was the chief source of food for households, but also encompassed orchards, cemeteries and pleasure gardens, as well as providing plants for medicinal and cultural uses. For monasteries, gardens were especially important in supplying the monks livelihood.  Primarily due to the fact that many of the plants had multiple uses: for instance, peaches were used for closing wounds.

The garden 
Concerning the structure of the gardens, they often were enclosed with fences, walls or hedges in order to protect them from wild animals. Even though wealthier monasteries could construct walls that were made out of stone and brick, wattle fences were used by all classes and were the most common type of fence. Occasionally, bushes were also used as fencing, as they provided both food and protection to the garden. Gardens were typically arranged to allow for visitors, and were constructed with pathways for easy access.  However, it was not uncommon for the gardens to outgrow the monastery walls, and many times the gardens extended outside of the monastery and would eventually include vineyards as well.

Incorporating irrigation and water sources was critical to keeping the garden alive. In some more complicated systems, the irrigation system used canals to control water-flow. This required that the water source be placed at the highest part of the garden so gravity could aid in the distribution of the water, with smaller canal channels branching out for greater distribution. This was more commonly used with raised bed gardens, as the channels could run in the pathways next to the beds.

When it came to the action of gardening itself, monks of this time typically would use astronomy and the stars to help in calculating the best time of year to plant their gardens as well as the best time to harvest. The tools that were used at the time were similar to those gardeners use today; for example, shears, rakes, hoes, spades, baskets, and wheel barrows were used by monks and are still pivotal to gardening today.

Medicinal 
Many medical practices migrated, and assimilated, into medieval Europe from the Islamic world as a result of the Islamic translation effort. As a result, gardening was particularly important for medicinal use. For example, when the peel of the poppy stalk was ground and mixed with honey, it could be used as a plaster for wounds. Other herbs and plants, such as roses, lilies, sage, rosemary and other aromatic herbs, were used for internal complications, such as a headache or stomachache. Almonds were said to aid sleep, provoke urination, and induce menstruation.

In practice, monks used these medicinal herbs not only for themselves, but also to help heal the local community.  One prominent healer was Hildegard of Bingen, an abbess who lived in a monastery housing both men and women. Eventually she was elected magistra and would later care for her own secluded monastery. Besides her extensive writing, Hildegard was regularly visited by people throughout Europe, including Henry II of England, the Holy Roman Emperor, and the empress of Byzantium, as well as the local community. Hildegard was seen as the “first woman physician” because of her work as a healer and medical writings.

Food 

Monasteries would also rely on their gardens to grow the food the monks needed. There were even monastic gardens that tried to grow produce that was both medically beneficial and appetizing, with vegetables high in starch or in flavor being sought after the most.  Some commonly found vegetables include:

Cemetery gardens 
In most cases, cemetery gardens were also a type of garden found in medieval monasteries. The vegetation would provide fruit, such as apples or pears, as well as manual labor for the monks as was required by the Rule of Saint Benedict. Cemetery gardens, which tended to be very similar to generic orchards, acted as a symbol of Heaven and Paradise, thus providing spiritual meaning and righteous labor.

Historical evidence 

The majority of data about monastic gardens can be found in the Middle Ages, primarily through archaeology, textual documentation, and artworks such as paintings, tapestry and illuminated manuscripts. The early Middle Ages brings a surprisingly clear snapshot of gardening at the time of Charlemagne with the survival of three important documents: the Capitulare de villis, Walafrid Strabo's poem Hortulus, and the plan of St Gall which depicts three garden areas and lists what was grown. Further evidence can be found in dilapidated ruins of old monastic infirmaries, where some flowers, like peonies, have been found growing in large patches.

Primary sources on gardening 
"Apuleius", a late Roman translation of ancient Greek Herbal material, revived in England from the 11th century.
Charlemagne, Capitulare de villis (c. 800): listing the plants and estate style to be established throughout his empire. An imperial decree that leans heavily on classical sources; its impact is uncertain.
Palladius, Late Roman author of Opus agriculturae, sometimes known as De re rustica.  On farming rather than gardening. Translated into Middle English verse as  On husbondrie. c. 1420
Walahfrid Strabo, Hortulus, poem by a 9th-century German monk, praising his garden at Reichenau Abbey and listing its plants.
Jon Gardener, The Feate of Gardening. c. 1400: poem containing plant lists and outlining gardening practices, probably by a royal gardener
Friar Henry Daniel (14th century): compiled a list of plants
Albertus Magnus, De vegetabilibus et plantis (c. 1260): rewrites De Plantis, a book then wrongly believed to be by Aristotle. Fundamental enquiry into the nature of plants, only peripherally concerned with how to grow them. 
Piero de' Crescenzi, Ruralium Commodorum Liber (c. 1305). The most important practical medieval work, still mostly about agriculture, and drawing heavily on classical sources. His experience came from buying a country estate, as a successful lawyer. 
'Fromond List', original titled Herbys necessary for a gardyn (c. 1525): list of garden plants
Thomas Hill (born c. 1528).
Master Fitzherbert, The Booke of Husbandrie (1534): includes commentary on past horticultural practices
T. Tusser, Five Hundred Points of Good Husbandry (1580): another relevant commentary though written in the post medieval period<ref>Landsberg Sylvia, The Medieval Garden, The British Museum Press, passim</ref>

 Further reading on medieval gardening 

 Crisp, Frank; Mediaeval Gardens Landsberg, Sylvia; The Medieval Garden 1995
 Wright, Richardson; The Story of Gardening from the Hanging Gardens of Babylon to the Hanging Gardens of New York, 1934
 John Harvey; Mediaeval Gardens''

See also
 List of garden types

References

External links 
 Penn State Medieval Garden recreation
 Bodleian Library, Tradescant's Orchard, watercolours of garden fruits, c. 1620
 Gode Cookery, Tacuinum Sanitatis, medieval cooking
 Karolus Magnus, Capitulare de villis (Latin), c. 795
  Garden blog at the Cloisters, NYC
 Marian's Medieval Gardening Author list
  Garden blog at High Bridge, NJ

Types of garden
Garden design history
Monasteries